Manor Parsley is a hamlet near Mount Hawke in Cornwall, England, UK.

References

Hamlets in Cornwall